Acinopterini is a tribe of leafhoppers in the subfamily Deltocephalinae. Acinopterini is made up of 2 genera over 35 species. Acinopterus is widely distributed throughout North and South America with more than 30 species; Cariancha and its two species are endemic to Brazil.

Genera 
There are currently two described genera in the tribe Acinopterini:

 Acinopterus 
 Cariancha

References 

Insects described in 1943
Cicadellidae